Pseudoxandra polyphleba is a species of plant in the family Annonaceae.  It is native to Bolivia, Brazil, Colombia, French Guiana, Guyana, and Peru.  Ludwig Diels, the German botanist who first formally described the species using the basionym Unonopsis polyphleba, named it after the distinctive veins (Latinized form of Greek , phléba) in its leaves.

Description
It is a tree reaching 4 to 15 meters in height. Its dull papery leaves are 10-19 by 3-6 centimeters and come to a point at their tips.  The leaves are hairless on their upper and lower surfaces, but can have small warty bumps.  The leaves have 10-15 distinct, straight secondary veins emanating from the primary vein.  Its petioles are 2-7 millimeters long. Its flowers are solitary or in pairs and axillary. Each flower is on a pedicel 2-5 millimeters long. Its flowers have 3 oval-shaped sepals that are 1-2 by 2-3 millimeters.  The outer surface of the sepals is hairless or slightly hairy. Its 6 petals are arranged in two rows of 3. The outer petals are white to yellow and 4-10 by 3-5 millimeters.  The outer petals are hairless on their outer surface. The inner petals are similarly colored and 3-8 by 3-5 millimeters. The inner petals are smooth on their outer surface. It has numerous stamens that are 1.5-1.7 millimeters long.  Each flower has 2-20 monocarps that are yellow, red, or near black at maturity and 10-15 millimeters wide. Its brown seeds are 8-13 by 7-12 millimeters.

Reproductive biology
The pollen of P. polyphleba is shed as permanent tetrads.

References

External links
 

Flora of Bolivia
Flora of Brazil
Flora of Colombia
Flora of French Guiana
Flora of Guyana
Flora of Peru
Plants described in 1937
polyphleba
Taxa named by Robert Elias Fries